Nicolas Noguier is the former president and founder of the LGBT organization Le Refuge supporting homeless LGBT+ youth in France. He resigned at the end of February 2021, after an external audit confirmed the irregularities revealed by the newspaper Mediapart. He is accused of rape by a young man who had been hosted by Le Refuge.

Early life 
Noguier grew up in Saint-Thibéry in a rural area as the child of winegrowers. He grew up in a religious household. Noguier was not forced into homelessness himself, but did face negativity after his coming out during his teenage years. At the age of 22, Noguier survived a suicide attempt.

Le Refuge 
Noguier founded Le Refuge in 2003. The first residents of the program were housed temporarily in a local hotel before the first structure dedicated full-time to the organization was built.

References

French LGBT rights activists
Living people
Year of birth missing (living people)